G.I.N.A fully explained as God Is Never Asleep is the debut album by Ghanaian rapper, Amerado, released on 25 October 2022 through MicBurnerz Music by ONErpm. The album contains 10 songs and was supported by two singles, "Back 2 Sender", and "Grace" featuring Lasmid.

Promotion and release 
Amerado announced G.I.N.A during a heated rap beef with fellow rapper Lyrical Joe. The announcement came as a surprise to music lovers as they were expecting a fifth diss song from Amerado.

Before the release of the album, a video involving former English football player Shaun Wright-Phillips endorsing the project surfaced.

Amerado partnered with music streaming platform Audiomack in their Premiere Access service to make four songs ‘Nyame Dada ft Fameye’, ‘No Stress ft S1mba’, ‘Pay Me’ and ‘Black Change ft Gidochi’ available for supporters from 20th October 2022 until the album dropped fully.

Track listing

References 

2022 debut albums
Hip hop albums by Ghanaian artists